Gubkinsky Urban Okrug is the name of several municipal formations in Russia:
Gubkinsky Urban Okrug, Belgorod Oblast, a municipal formation in Belgorod Oblast, which the town of oblast significance of Gubkin and Gubkinsky District are incorporated as
Gubkinsky Urban Okrug, a municipal formation in Yamalo-Nenets Autonomous Okrug, which the town of okrug significance of Gubkinsky is incorporated as

See also
Gubkinsky (disambiguation)

References